UFO: A Day in the Life is an adventure puzzle game developed by Love-de-Lic and published by ASCII Entertainment for the PlayStation exclusively in Japan.

Gameplay
UFO: A Day in the Life puts the player in the role of attempting to save a group of 50 fellow aliens who have been stranded on Earth after crashing into an apartment building. However, the aliens are invisible, and the player is unable to actually see the alien they are trying to rescue. To this effect, the player must use a device called "Cosmo Scanner," a kind of camera, to reveal the creatures. 

Once a certain number of photographs have been taken, the player character returns to the ship to develop the pictures. This is done by giving the negatives to a giant floating head called "Mother." As more aliens are rescued, more areas open up and different times of day are available for exploration.

Development
UFO: A Day in the Life was designed primarily by Taro Kudou. The game was announced and shown at the Tokyo Game Show in 1999. The game's music was composed by Love-de-Lic's internal sound team The Thelonious Monkeys, comprising Hirofumi Taniguchi and Masanori Adachi.

Release 
The soundtrack was released as the UFO: A Day in the Life Original Sound Tracks on a single 23-track disc, published by Sunday Records.

Reception 
Famitsu gave the game a score of 29 out of 40.

References

External links
 (web archive) 

1999 video games
Adventure games
Japan-exclusive video games
PlayStation (console) games
PlayStation (console)-only games
Puzzle video games
Video games about alien visitations
Video games about extraterrestrial life
Video games developed in Japan

Single-player video games
Love-de-Lic games